Sadayavarman Kulasekaran I was a Pandyan king, who ruled regions of South India between 1190–1216.

Accession and background
Kulasekaran acceded to the Pandyan throne after his father Vikkirama Pandyan in 1190. Vikkirama Pandyan had gained the throne of Madurai with the help of Kulothunga Chola III. Kulothunga had defeated the rebellion of Vira Pandyan and his Sri Lankan allies and awarded the throne to Vikkirama Pandyan. Vikkiraman's son Kulasekaran became the ruler in 1190. He was a brother-in-law of the Chera prince Kothai Ravivarman.

War and defeat
Kulasekaran was a vassal of the Chola empire. When Kulothunga was warring with Hoysalas in the north, he refused to pay tribute to the Cholas. This led to a Chola invasion in retribution. In 1205, the Chola armies defeated the Pandyan army and sacked Madurai. The ancient coronation hall of Pandyan kings was destroyed, the remains plowed with asses and sowed with weeds.  Inscriptions found at Kudimiyanmalai and Cheranur give graphic descriptions of the invasion and the sacking of Madurai. Kulasekaran and his younger brothers fled Madurai to the Palai (desert wastes) lands. The invaders looted Madurai and distributed the wealth to the destitute. Kulothunga performed a Virabhishekam (tribute of bravery) and crowned himself as Thiribhuvana veeran (Lord of Three Worlds). Kulasekaran surrendered to Kulothunga with his wife and son. Kulothunga acknowledged the surrender and gave his kingdom back. Madurai remained under Chola dominance until 1216. These excesses of Kulothunga directly led to the later Pandyan reprisal under Kulasekaran's younger brother and successor Maravarman Sundara Pandyan I.

Distinction from other Kulasekarans 
There are records of at least three later Pandyan kings bearing the same name Jatavarman Kulasekaran. This king is identified and distinguished using his meikeerthi which starts with the words poovin kizhathi. He is the Kulasekaran who donated the village "Rajaghambeeera Chathurvedi Mangalaam" to 1080 Brahmins in 1214

Notes

References
 
 
 
 
 
 

Pandyan kings
Tamil history
Year of death unknown
Year of birth unknown
12th-century Indian monarchs
13th-century Indian monarchs